The Zarya spacecraft was a secret Soviet project of the late 1980s aiming to design and build a large crewed vertical-takeoff, vertical-landing (VTVL) reusable space capsule, a much larger replacement for the Soyuz (spacecraft). The project was developed during 1985–1989 years by Energia corporation until it was shelved in 1989, "on the eve of the Soviet Union's collapse" due to lack of funding. The name of the project was later reused by the Zarya space station module which served as the first component of International Space Station in 1998.

Design

The Zarya spacecraft would have differed from all previous spacecraft by having an array of a dozen rocket engines for making a soft landing upon return to Earth, without using a parachute.

Mission
Zarya spacecraft would have brought crew and supplies to Mir or supplies only in automated mode.
It would have had a normal crew of one or two and offered the possibility of carrying a maximum of eight to twelve if used as a Mir lifeboat.

Timeline 
1985 January 27
 Preliminary design work began on Zarya "Super Soyuz". Concept was reusable spacecraft, launched by Zenit launch vehicle, with all possible systems recovered in landing module, together with significant payload delivered to and returned from orbit. Carriage in payload bay of Buran shuttle was also a requirement.

1986 December 22
 Zarya "Super Soyuz" briefed to the Military-Industrial Commission.
During 1989
 Zarya "Super Soyuz" cancelled on financial grounds.

See also

References

Proposed spacecraft
Crewed space program of the Soviet Union
Cancelled Soviet spacecraft
VTVL rockets